Moelfre is a village, a community and, until 2012, an electoral ward on the north-east coast of the Isle of Anglesey in Wales. The community area covers the village and harbour, and several smaller, dispersed settlements. It includes six scheduled Iron Age hut groups and many other sites of archaeological interest. The harbour was formerly a local fishing port; a lifeboat station has been based here since 1854. Among many shipwrecks off the coast was that of the Royal Charter in 1859. Near the modernised lifeboat station is the RNLI Seawatch Centre. The coastline includes a rocky headland north of the village and a large sandy beach at Lligwy Bay, both traversed by the Anglesey Coastal Path. The 2011 census measured the village population as 710. It was estimated at 614 in 2019.

Location
The village of Moelfre wraps around a small harbour sheltered from the north by a substantial headland and the rocky island of Ynys Moelfre. Also within Moelfre Community are the more dispersed settlements of Marian-glas, Llanallgo, Brynrefail and Mynydd Bodafon. It had a population of 1,064 at the time of the 2011 UK census. The village today has 502 households and 5 per cent unemployment. The Royal Mail postcode begins LL72. The main road through the community is the A5025, which is a five-minute drive from the village. The nearest mainline railway stations are in Bangor and Llanfairpwllgwyngyll. These can be reached in under half an hour by bus services which run through the village.

Heritage
The meaning of the Welsh name is "bald" or "barren hill", which refers to the land behind the village, as seen from the sea. The name has the same origin as that of the Malvern Hills.

Archaeology

The Community of Moelfre has 14 Scheduled Ancient Monuments, which is more than any other in Anglesey. The majority are prehistoric and include a neolithic burial site and a standing stone. However six of them are Iron Age settlements, suggesting a well-settled landscape by the time the Romans arrived. Three of the monuments (denoted in the table by ) are in the care of Cadw. These are signposted from the road, have public access and explanation boards at the site. Other scheduled monuments may or may not be visible from roads or footpaths, and have no automatic right of access.

Maritime history

The headland north of Moelfre was the site of the wreck in 1859 of the steam clipper The Royal Charter near the end of its voyage from Australia to Liverpool. A memorial on the headland and an obelisk in Llanallgo Churchyard commemorate the 400 lives lost. On July 30, 1862, the screw sloop Enrica, soon to be commissioned as the Confederate States of America warship CSS Alabama, sheltered in Moelfre Bay while evading both British customs authorities and the USS Tuscarora, which had been sent to capture or sink her.

The difficulties posed to sailing ships by the east-facing shore and limited seaway resulted in many ships being wrecked off the Moelfre coast. As well as the Royal Charter, there is the wreck of the Princess Amelia (1868) on Lligwy beach, and the Kate caught fire off Moelfre harbour in 1933. Many ships, like the Royal Charter and, 100 years later, the Hindlea II, ended up driven by autumn or spring gales onto the shore. On the 500m of coast south of Moelfre there are the wrecks of the Brothers (1826), the Sarah Davison (1881), the Riviera (1892), the Dart (1888), the Alexandrina (1890), the Margaret Elizabeth (1906), the Dinas (1907), the Jewess (1910) and the William Henry (1915).

Lifeboats

Moelfre RNLI Lifeboat Station has a distinguished history, including the Hindlea rescue in 1959, when all the crew were rescued. There has been a lifeboat in Moelfre since 1854. The lifeboat station is open to the public for most of the year, and houses the Tamar-class lifeboat Kiwi and the inshore inflatable D-class lifeboat (IB1) Enfys.

Actress Jennifer Ellison was rescued in August 2013 off Moelfre.

A statue of Richard Evans, lifeboatman, was unveiled in 2004 by Prince Charles, outside the Seawatch Museum, which is close to the lifeboat station. It presents information relating to the area and the history of the lifeboats associated with Moelfre.

Nature
This area is by the large sandy beach Traeth Lligwy and the ancient stone homestead of Din Lligwy. Nearby Ynys Moelfre is a haven for birds, and seals and porpoises may also be seen. There are more details on the village website.

Amenities

St Galgo's Anglican Church dates back to the 7th century. Carmel Congregational Chapel was built in 1829. Both have weekly services in Welsh and English. Paradws Chapel is Calvinistic Methodist.

The village has a school with a hall that can be used for public events. Ysgol Gymuned Moelfre (Community School) teaches in Welsh. There were 63 pupils at all levels in 2013. The local library is in the same building. The village also has a football club, CPD Bro Goronwy, based in School Lane.

There were no street lights in the village until well after the Second World War, when they were installed as a memorial to the village's war dead.

In the village there are restaurants, a bakery, and a fish and chip shop. The RNLI Gwylfan Moelfre Seawatch Centre has a small museum, shop and book store.

Notable people 
 Richard Evans (1905–2001) a lifeboatman with 50 years of service 
 Aled Eames (1921–1996), maritime historian, lived in the village for a long period.
 John Walter Jones (1946–2020), first Chief Executive of the Welsh Language Board from 1993 to 2004.

References

External links

photos of Moelfre and surrounding area on geograph
Location map for Royal Charter and Hindlea wrecks

 
Villages in Anglesey
Former wards of Anglesey